This is a list of properties and districts in Emanuel County, Georgia that are listed on the National Register of Historic Places (NRHP).

`

Current listings

|}

References

Emanuel
Buildings and structures in Emanuel County, Georgia